Scott Barlow (born 23 July 1976) is an Australian businessman. He is the founder of STRADA Group and the Chairman of Sydney FC.

Property 
In 2005, Barlow started property development and funds management firm STRADA. Based in Sydney, STRADA specialises in commercial funds management and luxury residential development.

Sydney FC 
Barlow is the Chairman of Sydney FC and has been a member of the board since the club's inception in 2005. Barlow served as Vice Chairman of Sydney FC from 2009 to 2012.  Between 2009 and 2011 Barlow was a member of the FIFA committee for club football representing Australia.

Education 
Barlow holds a Bachelor of Commerce from the University of Tasmania and a Graduate Certificate in Applied Finance and Investment from the Securities Institute of Australia.

References 

1976 births
Sydney FC
Living people
Australian soccer chairmen and investors
University of Tasmania alumni
Australian company founders
Businesspeople from Sydney